Southview is a census-designated place located in Mount Pleasant and Cecil Townships in Washington County in the state of Pennsylvania.  Southview is located in northern Washington County along Southview Road, within a mile of Pennsylvania Route 50.  As of the 2010 census the population was 276 residents.

History
Southview was built as a coal town for the Montour No. 1 coal mine, which opened in 1914. The village was considered to be a first-class miners' town and included housing for miners and their families, as well as a company store. The exact date of the mine closing is unknown, but it was probably closed between 1932 and 1939, according to the aerial photos.

References

Census-designated places in Washington County, Pennsylvania
Census-designated places in Pennsylvania